"Maybe Not Tonight" is a song written by Keith Stegall and Dan Hill, and recorded by American country music artists Sammy Kershaw and Lorrie Morgan.  It was released in February 1999 as the first single and title track from Kershaw's album Maybe Not Tonight.  The song reached #17 on the Billboard Hot Country Singles & Tracks chart. It was the final top 20 hit for both Morgan and Kershaw.

Chart performance

References

1999 singles
1999 songs
Sammy Kershaw songs
Lorrie Morgan songs
Songs written by Dan Hill
Songs written by Keith Stegall
Song recordings produced by Keith Stegall
Male–female vocal duets
BNA Records singles
Mercury Nashville singles